The Basilica of the Co-Cathedral of the Sacred Heart is a cathedral church and a minor basilica located in Charleston, West Virginia, United States.   Along with the Cathedral of St. Joseph in Wheeling it is the seat of the Catholic Diocese of Wheeling-Charleston.  The parish complex is a contributing property in the Downtown Charleston Historic District on the National Register of Historic Places.

History

Sacred Heart Parish
The first Catholic priest to visit what is now West Virginia came in 1832.  In 1836, the Rev. Alexander L. Hitzelberger of Norfolk, Virginia visited relatives in Charleston and celebrated Mass in the courthouse.  Bishop Richard Vincent Whelan of Richmond visited the city in 1842. Pope Pius IX established the diocese of Wheeling on July 19, 1850.  Various priests visited the area from time to time.  The Rev. Stenger settled in Charleston for a short time in 1862, but the Civil War hindered his ministry.  He was able to return and settle in the town again in 1866.  There was no church building at the time so Stenger celebrated Mass on the second floor of B. Ward's store on Front Street (now Kanawha Boulevard).

Sacred Heart parish was established on August 1, 1866, when Bishop Whelan, who was now Bishop of Wheeling,  purchased the Dunbar property in Charleston. A two-story brick building served as a church and school. It sat on the site of the present rectory on Virginia Street. The rectory was located on the site of the old courtyard. The first assistant pastor assigned to Sacred Heart in 1870 was the Rev. Terence I. Duffy. Both priests established and served various missions in the area.

In 1885, Father Stenger began collecting funds for a new church and prominent Protestants also provided financial assistance.  By 1892, the parish census showed 84 English families and 56 German families.  The school had an enrollment of 90 students.  He selected H.B. Lowe as architect for the new church, and spent $600 for plans and specifications for the new building.   The congregation celebrated its first Mass in the present church Christmas in 1897.

Father Stenger died in 1900 and in April 1901 Capuchin friars began their ministry at Sacred Heart. They constructed a new rectory the following year and made additions to the church building in the first decade of the 20th century.  The first pipe organ came to the sanctuary in 1905. The marble high altar and stained glass windows from Munich, Germany followed in 1909. The three bells placed in the tower in 1911 are named: St. Richard, St. Joseph and the Blessed Virgin and weigh ,  and  respectively.

In 1948, the congregation purchased a Wurlitzer electronic organ for $4,500.00 to replace the old pipe organ.   The St. Cecilia's Guild started a weekly bingo to raise the money for a new Kilgen pipe organ, which cost $31,832.48.  The interior of the church was extensively renovated from 1950 to 1951 and the front portion of the current rectory was completed the following year. The parish completed a new convent in 1958 which eventually became the Cenacle Retreat House.  The present pews were installed in the church in 1958 for $11,429.  Artist John L. Baker painted the sanctuary ceiling with a vibrant, complex linear painting in 1966.

Sacred Heart Co-Cathedral
On October 4, 1974, Pope Paul VI renamed the Diocese of Wheeling as the Diocese of Wheeling-Charleston and Sacred Heart Church became the co-cathedral for the diocese.  In 1980, the Capuchins left the parish after ministering at the parish for 79 years.  A diocesan priest, the Rev. Edward Sadie became the cathedral rector.

Various renovation and building projects occurred in the 1980s.  The parish initiated a capital fund drive called Growth In Faith Together to renovate the cathedral inside and out.  The project included air-conditioning, cleaning and repairing the stained glass windows and a Schantz 58-rank, three-manual pipe organ (opus 1765).  The parish purchased the former Kanawha Valley Hospital building to construct a parking lot and in 1985, dedicated the John XXIII Pastoral Center. New carpeting graced the sanctuary and furniture maker Edward Hillenbrand created a new Bishop's Chair, Ambo and Altar.  Bishop Francis B. Schulte dedicated the completed cathedral in 1988.

In the 1990s, the parish purchased Riverview Terrace to become a complex for the elderly.  The purchase was made possible in part through the estates of Blanche and Maxine Horan.  The parish joined with First Presbyterian Church to construct two houses for Habitat for Humanity.

In the first decade of the 21st century the parish purchased the parking lot of the Charleston newspaper, remodeled the Cenacle Retreat property for parish office space and apartments for the parish clergy, renaming it the Cordis Center.  It also renovated the cathedral and added a new gathering space to the structure.  On November 9, 2009, Pope Benedict XVI raised Sacred Heart to the dignity of a minor basilica.

Catholic schools
The first school at Sacred Heart opened in 1866 in the Dunbar Building that served as a combination church and school.  For the rest of the 19th century the school was not a stable entity.  It ceased operating in 1868 until the Sisters of St. Joseph reopened it in 1870.  At the same time, a boarding school named St. Mary's Academy opened and operated until 1895.  The school occupied a new building in 1872 but it closed again in 1892. The Franciscan Sisters of Penance and Christian Charity reopened it in 1903 and constructed a new convent in 1904.

A new school building opened on September 8, 1920, and the first high school classes began in 1922. The parish purchased and renovated a building to house the high school in 1927.  Bishop John Swint laid the cornerstone for a new high school in 1940 and the building opened the following year as Charleston Catholic High School.  The grade school was remodeled in 1942 and the Dunbar Building, which had served as grade school, convent, rectory for the Capuchins, school, first high school, parish hall, and parish library was demolished.  The school added Kindergarten classes in 1952 and a third floor to the high school building in 1956.  The current grade school building opened in 1962 at a cost of $521,140.

The school constructed a new playground in 1986, and renovated Seton Hall in 1990 with classrooms on second and third floors and space for the After School Care Program on the first floor.  In the 1990s, it initiated a $3.5 million fund drive to fund a new science wing for the high school.

See also
List of Catholic cathedrals in the United States
List of cathedrals in the United States

References

External links
Official Cathedral Site
Roman Catholic Diocese of Wheeling-Charleston Official Site

Religious organizations established in 1866
Roman Catholic churches completed in 1897
Sacred Heart Charleston
Basilica churches in the United States
Churches in the Roman Catholic Diocese of Wheeling-Charleston
Romanesque Revival church buildings in West Virginia
Buildings and structures in Charleston, West Virginia
Churches in Kanawha County, West Virginia
1866 establishments in West Virginia
Churches on the National Register of Historic Places in West Virginia
National Register of Historic Places in Charleston, West Virginia
Historic district contributing properties in West Virginia
19th-century Roman Catholic church buildings in the United States